MAZON: A Jewish Response to Hunger is an American nonprofit working to end hunger among people of all faiths and backgrounds in the United States and Israel.

MAZON, which means "food" or "sustenance" in Hebrew, practices and promotes a multifaceted approach to hunger relief, recognizing the importance of responding to hungry peoples' immediate need for nutrition and sustenance while also working to advance long-term solutions. This holistic approach - executed through three interrelated strategies of education & advocacy, partnership grant-making and strategic initiatives - symbolizes its desire to embody twin Jewish ideals: tzedakah and tikkun olam.

MAZON has offices in Los Angeles, California (headquarters) and Washington, D.C.

Leadership

Rabbi Joel Pitkowsky of Teaneck, New Jersey is the current chair of the Board of Directors. The immediate Past Chair is Liz Kanter Groskind of Tucson, Arizona. Other former board chairs include Shirley Davidoff of Dallas, Rabbi Harold Kravitz of Minneapolis, Minnesota, Joel E. Jacob, Eve Biskind Klothen, Theodore R. Mann, David Napell, and Rabbi Arnold Rachlis.

Abby J. Leibman is MAZON's President and Chief Executive Officer. Leibman has held this position since March 2011.

Inspiration and establishment

The founding of MAZON was inspired by the horrors of the Ethiopian famine of 1985, and was conceived by former Moment Magazine publisher Leonard Fein, who wanted to build a bridge between the Jewish community and millions of hungry people around the world.

According to Jewish tradition, rabbis did not allow celebrations to begin until the community's poor and hungry people were seated and fed. Fein's notion was to incorporate this ancient tradition into modern day celebrations such as bar and bat mitzvahs, weddings, anniversaries, and other joyous occasions, to help feed those who are less fortunate. One way for people to symbolically follow this tradition is to donate a portion of the cost of these events to MAZON, either directly or through MAZON's many partner synagogues across the nation.

Work

MAZON, which means "food" or "sustenance" in Hebrew, believes ending hunger will require a holistic approach, acting to ensure that hungry people have access to the nutritious food they need today and working to develop and advance long-term solutions so that no one goes hungry tomorrow. MAZON employs three interrelated strategies in its work to end hunger: 
 educating its synagogue partners and the larger Jewish community about hunger and engaging in policy-based advocacy at the state and federal level to ensure that hungry people have adequate access to the nutritious food they need to thrive; 
 awarding partnership grants that support local, state and federal-level advocacy work by anti-hunger organizations; and 
 developing and implementing strategic initiatives that advance knowledge and increase capacity within the anti-hunger community.

References

External links
 Official Website

Jewish charities based in the United States
Jewish-American political organizations
Charities based in California
Organizations established in 1985
1985 establishments in the United States